The European Space Tracking (ESTRACK) network consists of a number of ground-based space-tracking stations belonging to the European Space Agency (ESA), and operated by the European Space Operations Centre (ESOC) in Darmstadt, Germany. The stations support various ESA spacecraft and facilitate communications between ground operators and scientific probes such as XMM-Newton, Mars Express, BepiColombo, Gaia. Similar networks are run by the USA, China, Russia, Japan, and India.

Composition

The Core ESTRACK network is composed of seven ESA-owned ground stations and the ESTRACK Control Centre in the ESOC. Four of the stations are used for tracking satellites and launchers near Earth and three are used for tracking deep-space probes. Service contracts with commercially operated ground stations and cooperation agreements with international partners allows the network to track satellites that aren't in view of the ESA owned ground stations.

ESA stations

Core Ground Stations 
 Kourou Station (French Guiana)
 Kiruna Station (Sweden)
 Redu Station (Belgium)
Santa Maria Island Station (Azores, Portugal)

Deep Space Antennas 

 Cebreros Station (Spain)
 New Norcia Station (Australia)
 Malargüe Station (Argentina)

Augmented Network 

 South Point
 Santiago
 Troll
 Svalbard
 Dongara

Cooperative Network 

 Poker Flat
 Goldstone
 Weilheim
 Esrange
 Hartebeesthoek
 Malindi Space Centre (Kenya)
 Kerguelen
 Usuda
 Masuda
 Canberra

Former stations
 Perth Station (Australia)
 Maspalomas Station (Gran Canaria, Spain)
 Villafranca Station (Spain)

Antennas

Each ESTRACK station is different, supporting multiple missions, some sharing one or more of the same missions. The ESTRACK core network consists of:

Three 35-metre diameter deep space antennas  (New Norcia, Cebreros and Malargüe).
Three 15-metre antennas (Kourou, Kiruna, Redu)
One 13-metre antenna (Kiruna)
One 5.5-metre antenna (Santa-Maria)
One 4.5-meter antenna (New-Norcia 2)
One 2-meter antenna (Malindi, Kenya)
Six GPS-TDAF antennas

The antennas are remotely operated from the ESTRACK Network Operations Centre (NOC) located at ESOC. The ESTRACK core network is completed by antenna belonging to cooperative agencies and antennas belonging to commercial partners.

On 1 January 2013, the 35-metre station Marlargüe became the newest station to join the ESTRACK Deep Space Network.

The station in Santa-Maria can be used to track Ariane launches and it is also capable of tracking Vega and Soyuz launchers operated from ESA's Spaceport at Kourou, French Guiana.

The antenna in Malindi (Malindi Space Centre (Kenya)) can be used for Launch and Early Orbit Phases.

The small antenna in New-Norcia can be used for Launch and Early Orbit Phases and for tracking rain, Vega and Soyuz launchers operated from ESA's Spaceport at Kourou, French Guiana.

See also
 European Space Operations Centre (ESOC)
 European Space Research and Technology Centre (ESTEC)
 European Space Astronomy Centre (ESAC)
 European Astronaut Centre (EAC)
 European Centre for Space Applications and Telecommunications (ECSAT)
 ESA Centre for Earth Observation (ESRIN)
 Guiana Space Centre (CSG)
 European Space Agency (ESA)

References

External links
 ESA Operations website
 ESA webpage on ESTRACK, including links to all stations

Deep Space Network
Ground stations
European Space Agency